Yang Ke (born 19 April 1989) is a Chinese footballer as a left-footed winger.

Club career
Yang Ke started his professional football career in 2007 when he was loaned to Hangzhou Greentown's satellite team Hangzhou Sanchao in the China League Two. On 11 March 2012, Yang made his debut for Hangzhou Greentown in the 2012 Chinese Super League against Qingdao Jonoon, coming on as a substitute for Xie Zhiyu in the 82nd minute. On 22 January 2015, Yang transferred to his hometown club Hunan Billows.
On 4 January 2017, Yang transferred to Super League side Chongqing Lifan on a free transfer.

Career statistics 
Statistics accurate as of match played 31 December 2019.

References

External links
 

1989 births
Living people
Chinese footballers
Association football midfielders
Sportspeople from Changsha
Footballers from Hunan
Chinese Super League players
China League One players
China League Two players
Zhejiang Professional F.C. players
Hunan Billows players
Chongqing Liangjiang Athletic F.C. players